Gianluca Zanetti (born 2 July 1977) is an Italian former footballer who played as a defender. Throughout his career, he played over 200 matches in the Lega Pro Prima Divisione, the third-highest level of Italian football.

Career
Born in Forlimpopoli, the Province of Forlì-Cesena, Zanetti started his career at Cesena. He then left for Serie B side Monza. In January 1998, he was signed by A.C. Milan but played nil match. In 1998–99 season, he returned to Monza on loan. In the next season, he played at Serie C2 side Cremonese. In 2000–01 season, he left for Livorno on loan. But in October 2000, he swapped club with Alessio Sarti but immediate left for Serie C1 side Castel di Sangro, where he regularly picked up by the coach. In January 2002 he left for Serie C1 side Pescara, where he won promotion playoffs in 2003.

In 2003–04 season, he left for Serie C1 side Teramo but failed to play regularly.

Sambenedettese
In 2004, he was transferred to Sambenedettese but faced a knee injury. In April 2005, he was offered a new 2-year contract with Sambenedettese. In October 2005 he returned from injury and played his first match of the season. He was the regular of the team, and became the team captain. After the resignation of the coach, he worked with teammate Gianluca Colonnello, who also worked as caretaker manager to manager the team.

Foggia
In next season he left for Serie C1 side Foggia, signed a 1-year contract. He was ruled out from squad by injury in March 2007. In July 2007, he left for Serie C1 side Lucchese. In January 2008, he returned to Foggia on loan. In July 2008 he deal became permanent after the bankrupt of Lucchese. He played regularly for Foggina including the two promotion playoffs, which lost to Benevento.

Bassano
In July 2009, Zanetti left for Seconda Divisione side Bassano, signed a 2-year contract. He missed the whole October due to injury and again in February for another injury.

In July 2011 he was signed by Rimini.

References

External links
 
 Profile at AIC.Football.it 

1977 births
Living people
People from Forlimpopoli
Italian footballers
Serie B players
A.C. Cesena players
A.C. Monza players
A.C. Milan players
U.S. Cremonese players
U.S. Livorno 1915 players
Parma Calcio 1913 players
Delfino Pescara 1936 players
A.S. Sambenedettese players
Calcio Foggia 1920 players
S.S.D. Lucchese 1905 players
Bassano Virtus 55 S.T. players
Aurora Pro Patria 1919 players
Rimini F.C. 1912 players
Association football defenders
Footballers from Emilia-Romagna
Sportspeople from the Province of Forlì-Cesena